The Forgotten Pistolero (Italian: Il pistolero dell'Ave Maria, lit. "The Gunman of Hail Mary") is a 1969 Italian Spaghetti Western film co-written and directed by Ferdinando Baldi. The film is a western adaptation of the Greek myth of Orestes, subject of three famous drama-plays by Aeschylus, Sophocles and Euripides. Ulrich P. Bruckner puts it among the "most interesting and most touching Spaghetti Westerns of the late sixties".

Plot 
When he returns home from war the Mexican general Juan Carrasco is killed by the lover of his wife Anna and by Anna as well. The victim's children run away with their nanny but fifteen years later they come back for revenge. Anna and Tomas want to have them killed but their henchmen failed to do so. It turns out that Anna is not the real mother of the dead general's children.

Cast 
 Leonard Mann as Sebastian Carrasco
 Luciana Paluzzi as Anna Carrasco
 Peter Martell as Rafael Garcia
 Alberto de Mendoza as Tomas 
 Pilar Velázquez as Isabella Carrasco
 Piero Lulli as Francisco 
 Luciano Rossi as Juanito 
 José Suárez as General Juan Carrasco
 Barbara Nelly as Conchita
 Enzo Fiermonte as Friar 
 José Manuel Martín as Miguel

Releases
Wild East Productions released this on a limited edition DVD in 2007 with The Unholy Four.

See also
 List of Italian films of 1969
 List of Spaghetti Western films

References

External links

1969 films
Films based on works by Euripides
Spaghetti Western films
1969 Western (genre) films
Films directed by Ferdinando Baldi
Films with screenplays by Vincenzo Cerami
Films shot in Almería
Films scored by Roberto Pregadio
Modern adaptations of works by Euripides
Works based on Agamemnon (Aeschylus play)
Works based on The Libation Bearers
Modern adaptations of works by Aeschylus
Films based on works by Aeschylus
1960s Italian films